Kenyarctia epicaste is a moth in the family Erebidae. It was described by James Farish Malcolm Fawcett in 1915. It is found in Kenya.

References

Moths described in 1915
Spilosomina